Conor McCarthy may refer to:
 Conor McCarthy (Gaelic footballer) (born 1981)
 Conor McCarthy (association footballer) (born 1998)